One Day Like Rain is a 2007 American science fiction drama film written and directed by Paul Todisco and starring Samantha Figura, Marina Resa and Jesse Eisenberg.

Cast
Samantha Figura as Gina
Marina Resa as Jennifer
Jesse Eisenberg as Mark
Trevor Zacharias as Stefan
William P. Benz as Ian
Dylan Kussman
Dalton Leeb as Jeremy
Marisa Petroro as Tatiana

Reception
Robert Koehler of Variety gave the film a negative review and wrote that the film's "tendency to stuff too many notions and devices into less than 90 minutes — from Richard Kelly-ish everyday apocalypse to scenes of alien creatures on what may be Mars (judging from the production company moniker) — points to an imaginative, overactive and serious mind that has yet to find its voice."

References

External links
 
 

American science fiction drama films
2007 science fiction films
2007 films
2007 drama films
2000s English-language films
2000s American films